La Boum (English title: The Party or Ready for Love) is a 1980 French teen romantic comedy film directed by Claude Pinoteau and starring Sophie Marceau, appearing in her film début. Written by Danièle Thompson and Pinoteau, the film is about a thirteen-year-old French girl finding her way at a new high school and coping with domestic problems. The film earned 4,378,500 admissions in France and was an international box-office hit. The music was written by Vladimir Cosma, with Richard Sanderson singing the song "Reality". A sequel, La Boum 2, was released in 1982.

Plot
François, a dentist, and his wife Françoise, an illustrator, move to Paris and place their daughter Vic, aged 13, in one of the capital's best schools. Making friends, her free time becomes a whirl of discos, cinemas, and parties.

François is contacted by Vanessa, a former lover, who insists he spends another night with her and, when he tries to go home, rings Françoise to say he is in hospital. Seeing through this ruse, Françoise kicks François out, smashes up Vanessa's shop, and starts an affair with Éric, one of Vic's teachers, who is then punched in the street by François.

Trying to make sense of her parents' behaviour, Vic is helped by her great-grandmother Poupette, who encourages her in her relationship with Matthieu, the boy of her dreams, that results in a night together in a beach cabin. When François goes to pick Vic up from school, Matthieu insults him, not knowing who he is, and gets punched in the street.

Françoise discovers that she is pregnant and decides to reconcile with François. At her 14th birthday party, Vic is in the arms of Matthieu when she suddenly sees the boy of her dreams …..

Cast
 Sophie Marceau as Victoire "Vic" Beretton
 Brigitte Fossey as Françoise Beretton
 Claude Brasseur as François Beretton
 Denise Grey as Poupette
 Alexandre Sterling as Matthieu
 Dominique Lavanant as Vanessa
 Jean-Michel Dupuis as Étienne
 Sheila O'Connor as Pénélope Fontanet
 Alexandra Gonin as Samantha Fontanet
 Bernard Giraudeau as Éric Thompson
 Jean-Pierre Castaldi as Brassac
 Jacques Ardouin as Père de Raoul
 Evelyne Bellego as Éliane
 Richard Bohringer as Guibert
 Jean-Claude Bouillaud as Father Boum 2
 Vladimir Cosma as himself

Production

Soundtrack
 "Reality" (Cosma-Jordan) by Richard Sanderson – 4:45
 "It Was Love" (Cosma-Jordan) by The Regiment – 4:30
 "Formalities (instrumental)" (Cosma-Jordan) by Orchestra Vladimir Cosma – 3:40
 "Gotta Get a Move On" (Cosma-Jordan) by Karoline Krüger – 2:58
 "Swingin' Around" (Cosma-Jordan) by The Cruisers – 2:47
 "Gotta Get a Move On" (Cosma-Jordan) by The Regiment – 4:42
 "Formalities" (Cosma-Jordan) by The Regiment – 3:41
 "Gotta Get a Move On (instrumental)" (Cosma-Jordan) by Orchestra Vladimir Cosma – 3:00
 "Murky Turkey" (Cosma-Jordan) by Richard Sanderson – 3:48
 "Go On Forever" (Cosma-Jordan) by Richard Sanderson – 3:43

Reception

Box office
La Boum was an international box office success, earning 4,378,500 admissions in France, 1,289,289 admissions in Hungary, and 664,981 admissions in West Germany.

Critical response
In his review for AllMovie, Hal Erickson called the film "disarmingly diverting" and a "real audience pleaser".

Sequel

A sequel, La Boum 2, was released in 1982 in which Marceau reprised her role as Vic. In the sequel, Vic does not have a boyfriend, while her parents are happily back together, and her great-grandmother is considering marriage to her long-term boyfriend. When Vic meets a young boy and becomes attracted to him, she faces the important decision of making love for the first time, as her friends have already done.

References

External links
 
 
 

1980 films
1980 romantic comedy films
1980s coming-of-age comedy films
1980s French films
1980s French-language films
1980s teen comedy films
1980s teen romance films
Coming-of-age romance films
Films about parties
Films about puberty
Films directed by Claude Pinoteau
Films scored by Vladimir Cosma
French coming-of-age comedy films
French romantic comedy films
French teen comedy films